Corinthia ( Korinthía) is one of the regional units of Greece. It is part of the region of Peloponnese. It is situated around the city of Corinth, in the north-eastern part of the Peloponnese peninsula.

Geography

Corinthia borders on Achaea to the west and southwest, the Gulf of Corinth and Attica to the north, the Saronic Gulf to the east, Argolis to the south and Arcadia to the southwest. Corinthia is increasingly seen as part of the wider metropolitan area of Athens, with municipalities, such as Agioi Theodoroi in the easternmost part of the regional unit, being considered suburbs of Athens. The area around Corinth and the western Saronic including the southeastern part are made up of fault lines including the Corinth Fault, the Poseidon Fault and a fault running from Perahcora to Agioi Theodoroi. More faults are near Kiras Vrysi and Sofiko. The eastern coastlands of Corinthia are made up of pastures and farmlands where olives, grapes, tomatoes and vegetables are cultivated. The rest of Corinthia is mountainous. Its tallest mountain is Kyllini in its west and the largest lake is Lake Stymphalos, (important in Greek mythology and a bird resort, protected by Natura 2000) situated in the southwest. The reservoir will become one of the largest lakes after its completion. The climate of Corinthia consists of hot summers and mild winters in the coastal areas and somewhat colder winters with occasional snowfalls in the mountainous areas.

Administration
The regional unit Corinthia is subdivided into six municipalities. These are (number as in the map in the infobox):
Corinth (Korinthos, 1)
Loutraki-Perachora-Agioi Theodoroi (3)
Nemea (4)
Sikyona (6)
Velo-Vocha (2)
Xylokastro-Evrostina (5)

Prefecture

As a part of the 2011 Kallikratis government reform, the regional unit Corinthia was created out of the former prefecture Corinthia. The prefecture had the same territory as the present regional unit. At the same time, the municipalities were reorganised, according to the table below.

Population

Most of the modern inhabitants of the Corinthia are descendants of Arvanites. Large concentrations of those descendants live especially in mountainous regions, including Xylokeriza, Examilia, Sophiko and Kyras Vryse.

Main towns and cities
The main cities and towns of Corinthia are (ranked by 2011 census population):
Corinth 30,176
Loutraki 13,353
Kiato 9,812
Xylokastro 5,715

History

From 1833 to 1899, the Corinthia prefecture included Argolis and was known as Argolidocorinthia. It included Hydra, Spetses and Kythira. Argolis joined Corinthia to reform Argolidocorinthia again in 1909.  Forty years later, in 1949, the prefecture was finally separated from Argolis.

The highway was first paved at the turn of the 20th century. The mid to late-20th century saw the population shifting from agriculture to other jobs, as people migrated to larger towns and cities as well as other parts of the world. In the 1960s, the motorway GR-8A was constructed to handle the increasing traffic between Corinth and Athens and allow higher speed limits. The section from the old Corinth interchange eastward in Corinthia was opened in 1962 and the section west of Corinth was added in 1969. The new highway had a significant effect on the local industry, as it lowered the cost of transportation of goods between Corinthia and the Athens metropolitan area.

It will be the second largest body of water (lakes, reservoirs) in Corinthia. The dam will be designed to withstand earthquakes and natural disasters, including flooding. On July 17, 2007, a forest fire struck the area around the historic Acrocorinth and its castle.

Economy
The main sources of income are goods and services, manufacturing, tourism and agriculture.

Transport
Several major roadways are situated within Corinthia.

Motorways:
Olympia Odos (which integrates Greek National Road 8A)
Moreas Motorway
Highways – national roads:
Greek National Road 7
Greek National Road 8
Greek National Road 66

Communications
Top Channel – Corinth

Culture
Notable attractions include Ancient Corinth with its acropolis, Acrocorinth, the Corinth Canal, the thermal springs of Loutraki, the archaeological sites of Nemea, Sicyon and the Heraion of Perachora.

See also
List of settlements in Corinthia

References

External links
korinthia.net The Ultimate guide for Corinthia
GTP – Corinthia
Geomorphological Survey of Eastern Korinthia
 KRRC Geomorphology
Xenios Magazine articles on Corinthia
Kiato

 
Prefectures of Greece
1899 establishments in Greece
Regional units of Peloponnese (region)
States and territories established in 1899